Korzár (Slovak: Corsair) is a regional newspaper published in Košice, Slovakia. The paper has been in circulation since 1998.

History and profile
The newspaper was established in 1998. At the initial stage, the paper was named Korzo and was renamed later as Korzár. It is headquartered and published in Košice. The paper was published in broadsheet format. Then it switched to the tabloid format.

Korzár is the largest and only regional publication of Slovakia. It covers news on eastern Slovakia and has the highest circulation in the region. It has four regional editions. From 1998 to 2016 the editor-in-chief of the daily was Peter Bercik. In 2016 Jaroslav Vrábeľ succeeded him in the post. The publisher is the Petit Press publishing house. The Petit Press also publishes SME and Új Szó among others.

Korzár has a right-wing political leaning. 

The paper had a circulation of 33,000 copies in 2003 and 30,000 copies in 2004. The audited circulation of the paper was 27,231 copies in 2008. In 2011 the paper sold 20,000 copies, and its circulation was 15,713 copies in 2013. The same year its readership was at 5 percent.

See also
 List of newspapers in Slovakia

References

External links
  Official website

1998 establishments in Slovakia
Mass media in Košice
Newspapers established in 1998
Newspapers published in Slovakia
Slovak-language newspapers